Andrew Schnell (born November 1, 1991) is a professional squash player who represents Canada. He reached a career-high world ranking of World No. 60 in October 2016.

References

External links 
 
 
 
 

1991 births
Living people
Canadian male squash players
Sportspeople from Calgary
Squash players at the 2011 Pan American Games
Squash players at the 2015 Pan American Games
Pan American Games silver medalists for Canada
Pan American Games medalists in squash
Squash players at the 2019 Pan American Games
Medalists at the 2011 Pan American Games
Medalists at the 2015 Pan American Games
Medalists at the 2019 Pan American Games
21st-century Canadian people